Elmwood Park Historic District is a historic housing development in Bethlehem, Pennsylvania roughly bounded by Goepp Circle, Woodruff St., Park Pl., and Carson St.  The 68 houses in the district were built of brick, clapboard, and stucco from 1917 to 1920.

It is significant for its architecture, and was added to the National Register of Historic Places in 1988.

References

Historic districts in Northampton County, Pennsylvania
Colonial Revival architecture in Pennsylvania
Historic districts on the National Register of Historic Places in Pennsylvania
National Register of Historic Places in Northampton County, Pennsylvania